Martí Vigo del Arco (born December 22, 1997) is a Spanish sportsperson, who participated in cross-country skiing at the 2018 Winter Olympics. In 2020, Vigo del Arco transitioned to road bicycle racing with the Telco'm–On Clima–Oses team.

For the 2021 season, Vigo del Arco turned professional with the  team, having signed a two-year contract.

Biography
He started practicing sports at three years of age in Llanos del Hospital. In 2014, 2016 and 2017 he participated in the Junior World Championships, achieving in his last participation a 14th place in the 10 kilometer event. This result earned him the Carolina Ruiz award, awarded by the Spanish Federation to the best athlete with a projection.

His first appearance in the World Cup was in 2018 in Dresden, finishing in 67th place and 22nd in team.

Results in the Olympic Games

References

External links

Cross-country skiers at the 2018 Winter Olympics
Olympic cross-country skiers of Spain
Living people
Spanish male cross-country skiers
1997 births
Spanish male cyclists
People from Ribagorza
Sportspeople from the Province of Huesca
Cyclists from Aragon